Hope and Horror is an EP from  the band Immolation. The album was released four days before their seventh full-length album Shadows in the Light. The EP is a bundle containing the EP and a DVD.

Track listing

DVD tracks

Personnel
Ross Dolan – bass, vocals
Robert Vigna – guitars
Bill Taylor – guitars
Steve Shalaty – drums

Immolation (band) albums
2007 EPs

ru:Shadows in the Light